Dengshikou station is a station on Line 5 of the Beijing Subway.

Station Layout 
The station has an underground island platform.

Exits
There are two exits, lettered A and C. Exit C is accessible.

Gallery

References

External links
 

Beijing Subway stations in Dongcheng District